Milesia brunetti is a species of hoverfly in the family Syrphidae.

Distribution
Laos, Nepal.

References

Insects described in 1923
Eristalinae
Diptera of Asia